Agios Konstantinos is a town and former municipality in Phthiotida (Phthiotis), Greece. After the 2011 administrative division reforms it became part of the municipality of Kamena Vourla and it is now ranked as a municipal unit. The municipal unit has an area of 72.292 km2. Its population was 3,183 in 2011.

The town has a harbor with a regular ferry-boat connection to the islands of Skiathos, Skopelos and Alonnisos. These islands are part of the Northern Sporades archipelago.

References

Populated places in Phthiotis